Tavda is a town in Sverdlovsk Oblast, Russia, located on the river Tavda and functioning as a river port. Population:

References

Cities and towns in Sverdlovsk Oblast